The 2018–19 Bucknell Bison women's basketball team represents Bucknell University during the 2018–19 NCAA Division I women's basketball season. The Bison, led by eighth year head coach Aaron Roussell, play their home games at Sojka Pavilion and are members of the Patriot League. Bucknell won the Patriot Conference tournament championship game over American, 66–54 to earn an automatic trip to NCAA women's tournament. They lost in the first round to Florida State. They finished the season 28–5, 16–2 in Patriot League play to share the Patriot League regular season title with American. With 28 wins, they finish with the most wins in program history.

At the conclusion of the season, head coach Aaron Roussell left the team to take the coaching job at the University of Richmond. The school went to the Division III ranks for its new hire, naming Scranton's Trevor Woodruff as their new coach on April 26.

Roster

Schedule

|-
!colspan=9 style=| Non-conference regular season

|-
!colspan=9 style=| Patriot League regular season

|-
!colspan=9 style=| Patriot League Women's Tournament

|-
!colspan=9 style=| NCAA Women's Tournament

See also
 2018–19 Bucknell Bison men's basketball team

References

Bucknell
Bucknell Bison women's basketball seasons
Bucknell
Bucknell
Bucknell